Ladislav Hučko (born 16 February 1948) is a Slovak hierarch of the Ruthenian Greek Catholic Church active in the Czech Republic.

Hučko was born in Prešov, Czechoslovakia (present-day in Slovakia) and was ordained a priest on 30 March 1996. Hučko was appointed titular bishop of Horaea as well as Apostolic Exarch of the Apostolic Exarchate in the Czech Republic on 24 April 2003 and ordained a bishop on 31 May 2003.

References

External links 
 Profile at Catholic-Hierarchy.org
 Profile at GCatholic.org

Czech bishops
Slovak bishops
Slovak Eastern Catholics
Slovak Greek Catholic bishops
1948 births
Living people
People from Prešov
Ruthenian Catholic bishops